Moussa Konaté (1951 – 30 November 2013) was a Malian writer who was born in Kita. He died in Limoges on 30 November 2013.

A graduate in Humanities at Mali's Ecole Normale Supérieure of Bamako, he was a teacher for several years before turning to writing.

Publications

Novels
L'Empreinte du renard, Fayard, 2006.
L’assassin du Banconi, suivi de L’Honneur des Keita, Editions Gallimard, Paris, 2002.
Goorgi, Editions Le Figuier, Bamako, Mali, 1998.
Les Saisons, Editions Samana, Bamako, Mali, 1990.
Fils du chaos, L’Harmattan, Paris, 1986.
Une Aube incertaine, Présence Africaine, Paris, 1985.
Le Prix de l’âme, Présence Africaine, Paris, 1981.

Stories
Sitan, la petite imprudente, Editions Le Figuier, Bamako, Mali, 1997.
Barou et sa méchante marâtre, Editions Le Figuier, Bamako, Mali, 1997.
L’Hyene et le Malin Fafa, Editions Le Figuier, Bamako, Mali, 1997.
Les Trois gourmands, Editions Le Figuier, Bamako, Mali, 1997.

Youth topics
La Savonnière, Editions Le Figuier, Bamako, Mali, 2003.
La Potière, Editions Le Figuier, Bamako, Mali, 2003.
La Fileuse, Editions Le Figuier, Bamako, Mali, 2003.

Social, politics
Mali–Ils ont assassiné l’espoir, essai, L’Harmattan, Paris, 1985.
Chronique d’une journée de répression, L’Harmattan, Paris, 1988.
Le casier judiciaire, nouvelle publiée dans le recueil La Voiture est dans la piroge publié par les Editions Le Bruit des Autres.

Plays

Khasso, (2004)
Un Appel de nuit (1995)
Un Monde immobile (1994)
L’Or du diable (1985)
Le Cercle au féminin (1985)
Le dernier pas

Films
Un Mali d'écrivains  2001. Films du Horla (Les)/France 3 Production Lille

References

External links
Africultures

1951 births
2013 deaths
Malian dramatists and playwrights
Male dramatists and playwrights
Malian non-fiction writers
Malian novelists
Malian male writers
Male novelists
20th-century novelists
20th-century dramatists and playwrights
People from Kita, Mali
20th-century male writers
Male non-fiction writers
21st-century Malian people